Laura Pausini is a compilation album of Italian singer Laura Pausini's greatest hits and other selected tracks. It was released by CGD (Warner) Records for the anglophone market in 1995. Although it is a compilation album, the track listing is very similar to her previous 1994 album of the same name, despite this album being primarily Italian.

The album includes a little-known English version of Pausini's trademark song, La solitudine (in English, it was renamed "The Loneliness").

Track listing

Notes
"Song Search". Warner Chappell Music (Italy). Accessed 24 August 2007.

References

Laura Pausini compilation albums
1995 compilation albums
Compagnia Generale del Disco albums